MS Isle of Innisfree  is a passenger and car ferry to be operated by Irish Ferries between Dover and Calais. Originally built at Boelwerf as the Prins Filip originally sailing between Dover and Ostend, later between Ostend and Ramsgate, she has since 1997 (the year RMT shut down) operated for a wide variety of companies.

Design
The Isle of Innisfree is a unique ship, the only one of her class. She was built in 1991 for Regie voor Maritiem Transport for the company's Dover-Ostend operations. The ship has three decks accessible to passengers - as built the full three decks were accessible to passengers, however under DFDS only one full deck is accessible (the lower deck), and the other two are only accessible to passengers on the stern - the rest is designated for crew. The ship was built for the Dover-Ostend run, and hence is of a unique design - alongside having a bow and stern with two-level loading, the ship also has a unique side door on the starboard bow on the upper vehicle deck, allowing loading of the upper deck should the upper bow linkspan be unusable. However, after 1997 the door was sealed shut as there are no compatible linkspans elsewhere outside of Ostend, so it was essentially useless.

History

RMT 
The Prins Filip was built for Belgian operator Regie voor Maritiem Transport (RMT) in 1991, entering service in 1992 on its route between Dover and Ostend. She remained in service with RMT when its UK port was switched to Ramsgate and until RMT's operations ceased in 1997.

On 14 September 1994, an accident resulted in 6 deaths when a linkspan collapsed. Foot passengers were boarding the Prins Filip at Ramsgate. All publicity at the time was focused on Sally Line and Thanet District Council, the port owners, and not RMT or the Prins Filip.

P&O Stena Line 
Following a lay-up in Dunkirk, she was acquired by Stena Line in 1998, renamed Stena Royal and initially used on freight services between Dover and Zeebrugge on charter to P&O Stena Line.  In 1999, P&O Stena Line decided to extend the charter and transferred the ship to its Dover-Calais route. Stena Royal was extensively refurbished to include the P&O Stena 'Brand World' concept and entered service on the Calais route as the  POSL Aquitaine, following the naming pattern for P&O Stena Line vessels.

In 2000, the POSL Aquitaine failed to stop whilst berthing at Calais due to a propeller fault. The crash caused many injuries and extensive damage to both the ship and berth.

P&O Stena Line was a short-lived venture, ending in 2002 when P&O acquired Stena Line's share in the operation.  However, the POSL Aquitaine remained in service, initially under the name PO Aquitaine, then as the Pride of Aquitaine from early 2003 until May 2005 when she was withdrawn following the introduction of two new P&O ferries.

LD Lines 
In October 2005, she began sailing on the route between Portsmouth and Le Havre as Norman Spirit. LD Lines, a French-owned company with existing ferry operations on the Mediterranean Sea, began this service following P&O's withdrawal from it the previous month.

In June 2006, Norman Spirit was re-flagged to the British registry from the Italian second registry.  She was now registered in Southampton rather than Genoa, although when she entered service with LD Lines she was registered in Dover.

In September 2009, LD Lines announced that from November 2009 the vessel would be used on its service between Boulogne-sur-Mer and Dover.

TransEuropa Ferries charter 
In March 2010 the Norman Spirit was chartered by TransEuropa Ferries. In a joint service between TransEuropa Ferries and LD Lines, the ship was renamed Ostende Spirit and began sailing between Ostend and Ramsgate.

DFDS 
After changing the vessel name back to Norman Spirit, it was announced on 28 November 2011 that DFDS Seaways would charter the vessel from LD Lines to operate on its Dover-Dunkerque service. This was to help alleviate unexpected traffic pressure on the route caused by the announcement that SeaFrance was going into administration.

At 13:00 on 17 February 2012, the Norman Spirit was 'relaunched' by model and actress Kelly Brook to start a new service for DFDS Seaways and LD Lines, with up to five return crossings per day on the Dover-Calais route.

Following the merger between the two companies in February 2013, and a technical stop for fifteen days in shipyard Gdańsk, Poland, to redevelop the passenger reception, the Norman Spirit made her return to the port of Calais on 17 March 2013, sporting a new name Calais Seaways, and a new colour.

In 2018, DFDS announced an order for an E-Flexer class ferry from Stena RoRo in order to replace Calais Seaways. The new vessel is named Côte D’Opale, or in English, Opal Coast. The vessel was delivered in May 2021, entering service on 4 August 2021 after sea trials in April, and a lengthy delivery voyage from Weihai, China, where she was built.

On the same day as the Côte d'Opale was phased into service, the Calais Seaways was retired from DFDS service. Shortly afterwards she sailed to Dunkerque East, where she was laid up.

Irish Ferries
Shortly after the Calais Seaways was laid up, speculation and rumours started circling that the ship was sold to Irish Ferries and was to be renamed Isle of Innisfree. Speculation continued throughout August, September and October and into early November without confirmation. However, the speculation came to a close when on November 4, 2021, Irish Continental Group announced the ship's purchase from DFDS, alongside confirming the ship will be renamed to Isle of Innisfree.

Shortly after the purchase, the ship was reflagged from Le Havre in France to Limassol, Cyprus, in line with the Irish Ferries fleet. On November 17 she was moved into a floating dry dock at Damen Shiprepair Dunkerque for works before entry into service in December 2021, complementing the Isle of Inishmore. The Innisfree then departed Damen Dunkerque on December 14 early in the morning, arriving in Dover after anchoring off Calais and awaiting a harbour pilot just outside of Dover. The ship then started service the next morning for Irish Ferries, with the first commercial passengers sailing on December 16.

Fire in the English Channel

On 3rd of March 2023 a fire broke out in the engine room while the ship was sailing from Dover to Calais with 183 people on board, consisting of 94 passengers and 89 crew members. A French tugboat and three British lifeboats were dispatched to assist. No injuries were reported and the fire was overcome by crew members.

References

External links

Norman Spirit from LD Lines' official website
Photographs of the MS Norman Spirit
MS Norman Spirit on Ship Blog
Calais Seaways & Cote d'Opale comparison
Isle of Innisfree | Dover Calais information about the ship on Irish Ferries' website

Ferries of the United Kingdom
Ferries of France
1991 ships
Transeuropa Ferries